The Theban Tomb TT106 is located in Sheikh Abd el-Qurna. It forms part of the Theban Necropolis, situated on the west bank of the Nile opposite Luxor. The tomb is the burial place of the ancient Egyptian noble and Vizier, Paser.

See also
 List of Theban tombs

References

Theban tombs